Planten un Blomen is an urban park with a size of  in the inner-city of Hamburg, Germany. The name Planten un Blomen is Low German for "Pflanzen und Blumen" in German or "Plants and Flowers" in English.

History 
The first plant was a Platanus, planted by Johann Georg Christian Lehmann in November 1821. It can be seen next to the Hamburg Dammtor station entrance of the park. In 1953 and 1973 the Internationale Gartenbauausstellung (International Horticulture Show, IGA) were held at the park.

Overview 

The park is famous for its water-light concerts, public theater and music performances. In addition to the gardens, there is a large playground in the southern area of the park. This makes the park a popular place in the city. The park is open all year round and there is no entrance fee.

It contains the Old Botanical Garden of Hamburg.

See also 
Congress Center Hamburg (CCH)
Dammtor

External links 

 Website of Planten un Blomen 

Parks in Hamburg
Gardens in Hamburg
Urban public parks
Hamburg-Mitte
Tourist attractions in Hamburg